Aram Bagh may refer to the following places:

Aram Bagh, Agra, locality in Agra, India
Aram Bagh, Karachi, locality in Karachi, Pakistan